Edward Lee Lucas (born May 21, 1982) is an American former professional baseball third baseman and current hitting coach for the  San Francisco Giants.

After graduating from Dartmouth College in 2004, Lucas played in minor league baseball through 2013, when he made his Major League Baseball (MLB) debut with the Miami Marlins.

Career

Amateur career
Lucas attended Spruce Creek High School in Port Orange, Florida, and Dartmouth College. He graduated from Dartmouth in 2004 with a degree in sociology and economics. Lucas played college baseball for the Dartmouth Big Green under head coach Bob Whalen; and also played American football in his freshman year. Lucas won the Ivy League batting title as a senior, and was named Ivy League Player of the Year and received honors as Dartmouth's Most Outstanding Male Athlete of the Year.

Kansas City Royals
The Kansas City Royals selected Lucas in the eighth round of the 2004 Major League Baseball Draft. As Lucas could not return to college, he had little leverage in negotiations, and received a $1,000 signing bonus. He made his minor league baseball debut with the Idaho Falls Chukars of the Rookie-level Pioneer League, and earned $101 a month after expenses. Needing to work during the offseason, Lucas took jobs in construction, substitute teaching, bartending, and as a temp for the Charles Schwab Corporation.

Lucas had a .307 batting average for the Omaha Royals of the Class AAA Pacific Coast League (PCL) in 2010, but the Royals did not promote him to the major leagues.

Atlanta Braves
A free agent after the season, Lucas signed with the Atlanta Braves, receiving an invitation to spring training in 2011. He played for the Mississippi Braves of the Class AA Southern League and Gwinnett Braves of the Class AAA International League in 2011, but had a .238 batting average.

Los Angeles Angels
He signed with the Los Angeles Angels of Anaheim for the 2012 season, which he spent with the Salt Lake Bees of the PCL, batting .262.

Miami Marlins
In 2013, Lucas signed with the Miami Marlins. After batting .304 in his first 46 games with the New Orleans Zephyrs of the PCL, the Marlins promoted Lucas to the major leagues for the first time on May 29, 2013. He played in 94 total games, hitting .256, with 4 home runs and 28 runs batted in. The next season, Lucas continued his utility role, batting .251 in 69 games.

Texas Rangers
Lucas was claimed by the Texas Rangers on October 10, 2014.

Seattle Mariners
During the 2015-16 offseason, he signed a minor league contract with the Seattle Mariners. He was released on May 18, 2016.

Arizona Diamondbacks
On May 20, 2016, Lucas signed a minor league deal with the Arizona Diamondbacks. Free agent on November 2, 2016.

Post Playing Career
Lucas was hired in December 2016 as an administrative coach with the Miami Marlins. He is now the Director of Player Development for the San Francisco Giants.

Personal life
Lucas was born in Grand Rapids, Michigan and raised in Deltona, Florida. His parents are Ed and Sallie Lucas and he has one younger sister, Stevie Lucas. He is married. His wife, Holly Meyer Lucas, gave birth to their first child in September 2013 and second in September 2015. Holly is a realtor and owner of the Meyer Lucas Team at Compass in Jupiter, Florida. Her clients include notable professional athletes, baseball players and coaches with the Miami Marlins, St. Louis Cardinals, Houston Astros and Washington Nationals organizations.

References

External links

1982 births
Living people
Baseball players from Grand Rapids, Michigan
Burlington Bees players
Dartmouth Big Green baseball players
Gwinnett Braves players
High Desert Mavericks players
Idaho Falls Chukars players
Jupiter Hammerheads players
Major League Baseball third basemen
Miami Marlins coaches
Miami Marlins players
Mississippi Braves players
New Orleans Zephyrs players
Northwest Arkansas Naturals players
Omaha Royals players
People from Deltona, Florida
Round Rock Express players
Salt Lake Bees players
Tacoma Rainiers players
Wichita Wranglers players